The 2017 Red Bull Air Race of Porto was the fifth round of the 2017 Red Bull Air Race World Championship season, the twelfth season of the Red Bull Air Race World Championship. The event was held on Douro River in Porto, Portugal.

Master Class

Qualification

  Incorrect Passing Of An Air Gate: Incorrect Level Flying

Round of 14

  +0:03

Round of 8

  +0:01

Final 4

Final result

Challenger Class

Qualification

Results

Standings after the event

Master Class standings

Challenger Class standings

References

External links

 Porto Red Bull Air Race

|- style="text-align:center"
|width="35%"|Previous race:2017 Red Bull Air Race of Kazan
|width="30%"|Red Bull Air Race2017 season
|width="35%"|Next race:2017 Red Bull Air Race of Lausitz
|- style="text-align:center"
|width="35%"|Previous race:2009 Red Bull Air Race of Porto
|width="30%"|Red Bull Air Race of Porto
|width="35%"|Next race:　-
|- style="text-align:center"

Porto
Red Bull Air Race World Championship